Pyrenophora teres f. teres is a plant pathogen causing net form net blotch in barley.

References

External links 
 Index Fungorum
 USDA ARS Fungal Database

Pyrenophora
Fungal plant pathogens and diseases
Fungi described in 1923